William Anton Lesuk (born November 1, 1946) is a Canadian former professional ice hockey left winger who played in the National Hockey League (NHL) with the Boston Bruins, Philadelphia Flyers, Los Angeles Kings, Washington Capitals, and Winnipeg Jets. He also played in the World Hockey Association (WHA) with Winnipeg. He won the Stanley Cup in 1970 with the Bruins. He was traded along with Serge Bernier and Jim Johnson from the Flyers to the Kings for Ross Lonsberry, Bill Flett, Jean Potvin and Eddie Joyal on January 28, 1972.

Career statistics

Regular season and playoffs

Awards
 CMJHL Second All-Star Team – 1967

References

External links
 

1946 births
Living people
Arizona Coyotes scouts
Boston Bruins players
Boston Bruins scouts
Canadian expatriate ice hockey players in the United States
Canadian ice hockey left wingers
Chicago Blackhawks scouts
Hershey Bears players
Ice hockey people from Saskatchewan
Los Angeles Kings players
Oklahoma City Blazers (1965–1977) players
Philadelphia Flyers players
Sportspeople from Moose Jaw
Stanley Cup champions
Tulsa Oilers (1964–1984) players
Washington Capitals players
Weyburn Red Wings players
Winnipeg Jets (1979–1996) players
Winnipeg Jets (1972–1996) scouts
Winnipeg Jets (WHA) players